Tino Mewes (born 5 April 1983) is a German actor. He has appeared in more than fifty films since 2002.

Filmography

References

External links 

1983 births
Living people
German male film actors